Peyton Sophia Vincze (born 19 October 2000) is a footballer who plays as a forward for Oklahoma State Cowgirls of the Big 12 Conference and the Wales women's national football team.

Early life
Vincze was born in Kansas. Her mother had been born in Wrexham, Wales, but had moved to Canada at four months old before relocating to the United States in her twenties. Vincze attended Andover Summer Elementary School where she won the Butler County spelling bee in 2012.
She later attended Andover High School. In 2019, she was named to the Wichita Eagle's All-Metro Track and Field team. She began playing football at the age of three and has an older sister who also played football at youth level.

In 2017, Vincze joined FC Wichita following the team's founding as the only non-collegiate outdoor women's football team in Wichita. She made her debut in the Women's Premier Soccer League during a 4–2 victory over Texas Spars on 6 January 2018 and scored her first goal in her second appearance, a 2–0 win over Oklahoma City.

College career
Vincze committed to play collegiate football for Oklahoma State Cowgirls at the age of 16. Signed as part of its 2019 recruiting class, Cowgirls coach Colin Carmichael described Vincze as "an athletic, aggressive, hard-working forward who leads the line by herself. She's strong, she's a handful who never quits and she's a tireless worker who is constantly looking to improve."

International career
Although born in the United States, Vincze represents Wales at international level, qualifying via her Welsh-born mother. Her eligibility only came to light during a training academy set up by Welsh side Swansea City in the U.S., with Vincze being ignorant of the fact that she qualified to play for the nation. Her first involvement with the Welsh side was at under-17 level, making her debut in an 8–1 defeat to Norway in March 2017. Five days later she scored her first goal for her adopted nation with the winning strike in a 1–0 victory over Bosnia-Herzegovina.

Vincze made her debut for the Wales senior side on 11 June 2017 in a 1–0 defeat to Portugal as a second-half substitute. In October 2017, less than a year after discovering she was eligible to represent Wales, Vincze was named Football Association of Wales (FAW) Young Player of the Year.

Honours
 FAW Young Player of the Year: 2017

References

External links
 Oklahoma State profile

2000 births
Living people
Welsh women's footballers
Wales women's international footballers
Women's association football forwards
Women's Premier Soccer League players
American women's soccer players
American people of Welsh descent
Soccer players from Kansas
21st-century American women